Logan Pearsall Smith (18 October 1865 – 2 March 1946) was an American-born British essayist and critic. Harvard and Oxford educated, he was known for his aphorisms and epigrams, and was an expert on 17th Century divines. His Words and Idioms made him an authority on correct English language usage. He wrote his autobiography, Unforgotten Years, in 1938.

Early life

Smith was born in Millville, New Jersey. He was the son of the prominent Quakers Robert Pearsall Smith and Hannah Whitall Smith, and a descendant of James Logan, who was William Penn's secretary and the Chief Justice of Pennsylvania in the 18th century. His mother's family had become wealthy from its glass factories. He lived for a time as a boy in England. In his 1938 autobiography, Smith describes how in his youth he came to be a friend of Walt Whitman in the poet's latter years.

Smith's sister Alys was the first wife of philosopher Bertrand Russell. His sister Mary was married twice, first to the Irish barrister Benjamin Conn "Frank" Costelloe. Their two daughters were Ray Strachey and Karin Stephen, in-laws to Lytton Strachey and Virginia Woolf, respectively. Mary later married the art historian Bernard Berenson.

Education
Smith attended The William Penn Charter School in Philadelphia, Haverford College, Harvard College, and the University of Berlin.   Smith later studied at Balliol College, Oxford, where he graduated in 1891.

Career
Smith employed a succession of young secretary/companions to help him. This post was Cyril Connolly's first job in 1925 and he was to be strongly influenced by Smith. Robert Gathorne-Hardy succeeded Connolly in this post.

Smith was an authority on 17th century divines.  He was known for his aphorisms and epigrams, and his Trivia has been highly rated. He was a literary perfectionist and could take days refining his sentences. With Words and Idioms he became a recognised authority on the correct use of English. He is now probably most remembered for his autobiography Unforgotten Years (1938). He was much influenced by Walter Pater. He was a devotee of Jane Austen's fiction and referred to himself as a "Mansfield Parker." As well as his employees listed, his followers included Desmond MacCarthy, John Russell, R. C. Trevelyan, and Hugh Trevor-Roper. He was, in part, the basis for the character of Nick Greene (Sir Nicholas Greene) in Virginia Woolf's Orlando.

Personal life

He settled in England after Oxford with occasional forays to continental Europe and became a British subject in 1913. He divided his time between Chelsea, where he was a close friend of Desmond MacCarthy and Rose Macaulay, and a Tudor farmhouse at Warsash near the Solent, called Big Chilling.

Gathorne-Hardy described Smith as "a largish man with a stoop that disguised his height". Kenneth Clark further wrote "His tall frame, hunched up, with head thrust forward like a bird, was balanced unsteadily on vestigial legs".

Politically he was a socialist, having been converted by Graham Wallas, a founder of the Fabian Society.

His portrait, made in 1932 by Ethel Sands, is at the National Portrait Gallery, London.

Works

1895. The Youth of Parnassus, and other stories
1902. Trivia
1907. The Life and Letters of Sir Henry Wotton. Biography
1909. Songs and Sonnets
1912. The English Language
1919. A Treasury of English Prose
1920. Little Essays Drawn From The Writings Of George Santayana
1920 (ed.). Donne's Sermons:  Selected Passages with an Essay
1920. Stories from the Old Testament retold. Hogarth Press
1921. More Trivia
1923. English Idioms
1925. Words and Idioms
1927. The Prospects of Literature. Hogarth Press
1930 (ed.) The Golden Grove: Selected Passages From The Sermons and Writings of Jeremy Taylor
1931. Afterthoughts
1933. All Trivia. Collection
1933. Last Words
1933. On Reading Shakespeare
1936. Fine Writing
1936. Reperusals & Recollections
1938. Unforgotten Years
1938. Death in Iceland. Privately printed in Reading with Iceland: A Poem by Robert Gathorne-Hardy.
1940. Milton and His Modern Critics
1943. A Treasury Of English Aphorisms
1949 (ed.). A Religious Rebel: The Letters of "H.W.S." (Mrs. Pearsall Smith). Published in the USA as Philadelphia Quaker, The Letters of Hannah Whitall Smith
1949. (ed.). The Golden Shakespeare
1972. Four Words. Romantic, Originality, Creative, Genius
1982. Saved from the Salvage. With a Memoir of the Author by Cyril Connolly
1989. (Edward Burman, ed.) Logan Pearsall Smith. Anthology.

Notes

References
Robert Gathorne-Hardy (1949) Recollections of Logan Pearsall Smith
John Russell, ed. (1950) A Portrait of Logan Pearsall Smith drawn from His letters and Diaries
Robert Allerton Parker (1959), "The Transatlantic Smiths"
Barbara Strachey (1980) Remarkable Relations: The Story of the Pearsall Smith Family
Edwin Tribble, ed. (1984) A Chime of Words: The Letters of Logan Pearsall Smith
Hugh Trevor-Roper (2012) The Wartime Journals, ed. R. Davenport-Hines, London : I.B. Tauris

External links

 
 
 
 
Biographical source
Quote source
 "'Four romantic words"

1865 births
1946 deaths
American essayists
British essayists
Naturalised citizens of the United Kingdom
Writers from New Jersey
Aphorists
People from Millville, New Jersey
Harvard College alumni
Haverford College alumni
Alumni of Balliol College, Oxford
Humboldt University of Berlin alumni